The 15th Metro Manila Film Festival was held in 1989.

Vilma Santos and Christopher de Leon received top honors winning the Best Actress and Best Actor trophies in the 1989 Metro Manila Film Festival. Their movie on VIVA Films entitled Imortal wins the Best Picture award and eight more including Best Director for multi-awarded Eddie Garcia among others.

Seiko Films' Ang Bukas ay Akin won three awards while the Best Child Performer award went to Atong Redillas for the movie, Ang Mahiwagang Daigdig ni Elias Paniki.

Entries

Winners and nominees

Awards
Winners are listed first and highlighted in boldface.

Special awards

Multiple awards

References

External links

Metro Manila Film Festival
MMFF
MMFF